Company Quartermaster Havildar Abdul Hamid, PVC (1 July 1933 – 10 September 1965), was an Indian Army soldier who was posthumously given India's highest military decoration, the Param Vir Chakra, for his actions during the Indo-Pakistani War of 1965. 

Hamid joined the army in December 1954, and was posted to the 4th Battalion of the Grenadiers regiment. During the Sino-Indian War, his battalion participated in the battle of Namka Chu against the People's Liberation Army. During the Indo-Pakistani War of 1965, the 4 Grenadiers battalion was entrusted with a vital position before the village of Chima on the Khem Karan–Bhikhiwind line. At the Battle of Asal Uttar on 9–10 September 1965.

Military career

He joined the Grenadiers regiment of the Indian Army on 27 December 1954. He was later posted to the regiment's 4th Battalion (formerly the 109th Infantry), where he served for the rest of his career. He served with the battalion in Agra, Amritsar, Jammu and Kashmir, Delhi, NEFA and Ramgarh.

During the Sino-Indian War of 1962, Hamid's battalion was part of the 7th Infantry Brigade commanded by Brigadier John Dalvi and participated in the Battle of Namka Chu against the People's Liberation Army. Surrounded and cut off, the battalion broke out on foot into Bhutan and on to Misamari. Second Lieutenant G. V. P. Rao was posthumously awarded the Maha Vir Chakra for his actions during the war; it was the highest gallantry award received by the battalion since Indian independence, until Hamid's commendation.

Indo-Pakistani War of 1965

As a prelude to Operation Gibraltar, Pakistan's strategy to infiltrate Jammu and Kashmir, and start a rebellion against Indian rule, Pakistani forces attempted a series of incursions across the Jammu and Kashmir border. From 5 to 10 August 1965, Indian troops uncovered a mass infiltration. Captured documents and prisoners revealed Pakistan's plans to capture Kashmir with a guerrilla attack were brought to light; about 30,000 guerrillas were trained by the Pakistanis for this purpose. For reasons which remain unknown, the guerrilla troops were dispersed, dissipated or destroyed and the action never took place. Haji Phir and Phir Saheba were captured by India in an attempt to eliminate the guerrilla bases, and Pakistan launched an offensive which captured Chhamb and Jourian. Indian Air Force bases in Amritsar were also attacked.

In a counter-offensive, India launched operations across the international border. The 4th Infantry Division was charged with the capture of Pakistani territory east of the Ichogil Canal and the suppression of a possible attack along the Kasur–Khem Karan axis. After reaching the canal, the division awaited a Pakistani assault. 4 Grenadiers was entrusted with a vital position before the village of Chima on the Khem Karan–Bhikhiwind line.

Battle of Asal Uttar

4 Grenadiers arrived at midnight on 7–8 September, and had dug  trenches by dawn. At 7:30am they heard the first rumbles of Pakistani tanks, which straddled the road an hour and a half later. Hamid led the Jonga-mounted recoilless rifle (RCLR) detachment of his battalion. The Indians experienced artillery shelling at 11:30am, followed by another armour attack. Hamid knocked out another tank, and the Pakistani soldiers in the following tanks again fled. By the end of the day, an engineering company had laid anti-personnel and anti-tank mines around the Grenadiers' position.

Their battalion was attacked by Pakistani Sabre jets at 9:00am on 9 September, with mass casualties. The Pakistanis made armoured attacks at 9:30, 11:30am and 2:30pm. By the evening, Hamid had knocked out four tanks. The battalion destroyed a total of 13 tanks, and many were abandoned. The Indians withdrew a squadron of Sherman tanks, which were ineffective against the US built Pakistani Patton tanks. Centurion tanks were also withdrawn to deploy them in a position more suitable for a tank battle. As a result, the 4 Grenadiers were left with only RCL guns and mines. 

On 10 September at about 8:00 am the first wave of three tanks, one leading and the other two following at a  distance, arrived.  Hamid knocked out another tank with his RCL gun. The Pakistanis attacked again with increased artillery support at 9:00 am, and Hamid destroyed another tank. Since his open jeep was vulnerable to the shelling, he moved to another position and ordered his men to take cover. Hamid and a Pakistani tank soon spotted each other. Alone and unable to change his position, he fired at the tank as it fired at him and he was killed instantly.  The battalion suppressed further attacks by the Pakistanis, and the battle was a decisive Indian victory.

Param Vir Chakra
For his actions at the Battle of Asal Uttar, Hamid was awarded the Param Vir Chakra on 10 September 1965. The official citation read:

Military decorations

Legacy

A  stamp commemorating Hamid was issued by India Post on 28 January 2000 as part of a set of five stamps honouring recipients of awards for gallantry. The stamp has a bust of Hamid and an illustration of a jeep with a recoilless rifle.

Hamid's widow, Rasoolan Bibi, met Indian President Pratibha Patil in Lucknow in 2008 with requests to establish a military-recruiting center in his village, convert Hamid's home in Dullapur into a memorial, observe his death anniversary at the national level and help her grandchildren obtain government employment. Every year,  there is big sports and culture fair is organized in asal uttar village on 9 September in the memory of Abdul Hamid   A memorial to Hamid in his home village of Dhamupur which had fallen into disrepair was renovated in 2011 by the Flags of Honour Foundation for the 46th anniversary of his death. The renovation included a new statue of Hamid, repairs and painting of the gates and boundary, and improvements to the garden. Indian Member of Parliament Rajeev Chandrasekhar, founder of Flags of Honour, spoke on the occasion. On 10 September 2017, the 52nd anniversary of Hamid's death, then Chief of the Army Staff General Bipin Rawat unveiled a memorial in Ghazipur district. In February 2023, Adhikar Sena President Amitabh Thakur accused the Indian Government and Uttar Pradesh Government of neglecting the Dhamupur memorial.

In popular culture
The tenth episode of Param Vir Chakra, a 1988 TV series on the lives of Param Vir Chakra recipients, explored Hamid's actions on 10 September 1965. Hamid was played by Naseeruddin Shah, and the episode was directed by Chetan Anand.

Documentaries
Battle of Asal Uttar – Largest Tank Battle Since World War II (2018) is a TV documentary which premièred on Veer by Discovery Channel series, Mission & Wars.

Story of CQMH Abdul Hamid released by the Indian Army detailing the events of the battle and his death.

Notes
Footnotes

Citations

References

Further reading

1933 births
1965 deaths
Indian military personnel killed in action
20th-century Indian Muslims
military personnel of the Indo-Pakistani War of 1965
people from Ghazipur
recipients of the Param Vir Chakra